Montana Highway 81 (MT 81) is a state highway in the U.S. state of Montana. The highway begins at an intersection with MT 80 north of the hamlet of  Arrow Creek. The landscape traversed by MT 81 is uneven and largely rural, used mainly for agriculture and livestock grazing. For much of its length, the highway is roughly paralleled by the main line of  Central Montana Rail, which is headquartered in Denton.

Before receiving its current designation, MT 81 was designated as Secondary Highway 235.

Major intersections

See also

References

081
Transportation in Fergus County, Montana